The Fix is a British celebrity entertainment news show, that went out on  Living.  It features a mixture of star interviews and reviews. It was produced by Banana Split Productions.

External links
 

Sky Living original programming
2006 British television series debuts
2009 British television series endings
English-language television shows
Television news program articles using incorrect naming style